Helena Fourment or Hélène Fourment (11 April 1614 – 15 July 1673) was the second wife of Baroque painter Peter Paul Rubens. She was the subject of a few portraits by Rubens, and also modeled for other religious and mythological paintings.

Family
Helena Fourment was the youngest child of Daniël I Fourment, a wealthy Antwerp silk and tapestry merchant, and Clara Stappaerts. After his death, Daniel left to his son (Daniel II) an important collection of tapestries of Oudenaarde, Brussels, and Antwerp and 35 paintings of his son-in-law, a large painting of Jordaens and several works of Italian masters. They had four sons and seven daughters. Helena Fourment was buried together with her first husband, children and parents in the Saint James' church, Antwerp. Most of her sisters  married into important families.

Daniel I Fourment, died 1643 :  marr. Clara Stappaerts.

 Peeter Fourment, born 1590:Married to Antonia van Hecke.
 Daniel II Fourment, Lord of Wijtvliet, born 1592:married to Clara Brant, sister of Isabella Brant (1591–1626).
 Clara Fourment, (1593-1643):married to Peter van Hecke (1591–1645), tapestry dealer.
 Joanna Fourment, born 1596: married to Balthasar-Nicolaas de Groot.
 Susanna Fourment (1599–1628): married to Arnold Lunden, both painted by Rubens.
 Marie Fourment, born 1601:married to Henri Moens.
 Catharina Fourment, born 1603:married to Peeter Hannecaert, Alderman.
 Joannes Fourment, born 1609:married to Marie Volpi.
 James Fourment, born 1611.
 Elisabeth Fourment (1609–1667):married 23 October 1627 to Nicolas Pycqueri, died 1661: almoner of Antwerp.
 Helena Fourment (1614–1673):married to 1st Peter Paul Rubens, 2nd the 1st count of Bergeyck.

First marriage 
Helena Fourment married Rubens on 6 December 1630 in Saint James, when she was 16 years old and he was aged 53. His first wife, Isabella Brant, had died in 1626. Helena's brother Daniël Fourment the younger was married to Clara Brant, the sister of Isabella. Daniël Fourment the elder was an art lover and possessed works by Rubens and Jacob Jordaens, and works by Italian masters; he also commissioned from Rubens a series of tapestries depicting the life of Achilles.

Peter Paul Rubens, marr. 2nd to Helena Fourment:
 Clara-Joanna Rubens, baptized 18 January 1632: marr. Philips van Parys, knight 
 François I Rubens, bapt. 12 July 1633: alderman of Antwerp in 1659, marr. Susanna-Gratiana Charles.
Alexander Rubens, Lord of Vremdyck.
 Isabella-Helena Rubens, baptized 3 May 1635
 Peter III Paul Rubens, baptized 1 March 1637: ordained priest.
Constantia-Albertina Rubens, baptized 3 February 1641: entered La Cambre Abbey in 1668.

Second marriage 

After the death of Rubens, Helena started a relationship with Jean-Baptiste de Brouchoven, assessor and alderman of Antwerp, who later became 1st Count of Bergeyk. On 9 October 1644 their first son Jean de Brouchoven, 2nd Count of Bergeyck, was born, and Helena and Jean-Baptist married in 1645. Her second husband, who was a military knight of St-Iago, outlived her and died during a diplomatic mission in Toulouse in 1681.

Jean-Baptist de Brouchoven, 1st count of Bergeyck; married to Helena Fourment

Jean de Brouchoven, 2nd Count of Bergeyck, (1644-1725), later created 1st Baron of Leefdael:married to Livina Marie de Beer-Meulebeke.
Nicolas-Joseph de Brouchoven, 3rd Count of Bergeyck, 2nd Baron of Leefdael: (descendants upon today).
Hyacinthe-Marie de Brouchoven, Lord of Spy (1650-1707): 19th President of the Great Council;married to Marie-Adrienne Zuallart.
Guillaume-François de Brouchoven, Lord of Spy: dies without heirs.
Nicolas de Brouchoven, Lord of Attevoorde:married to Marie-Isabelle de Pommereaux, Lady of Hove
Henri de Brouchove, Lord of Hove
Catherine de Brouchoven':married to Gilles de Paepe, Lord of Glabbeecq, son of Léon-Jean de Paepe.
Marie-Fernandine de Brouchoven: entered a Carmelite convent.
Hélène-Isabelle de Brouchoven'; married Emmanuel-Joseph, Marquess of Villa-Flores

Helena died in Brussels in 1673 aged 59. Amongst the many descendants of her grandson the 3rd Count of Bergeyck we find Louis de Brouchoven de Bergeyck and his great-granddaughter Stéphanie, Hereditary Grand Duchess of Luxembourg.

Presence 
Helena Fourment was said to be very beautiful, amongst others by the Cardinal-Infante Ferdinand of Austria, then Governor of the Netherlands, stating that she was "undoubtedly the most beautiful one may see here", and by the poet Gaspar Gevartius, a friend of Rubens, who praised "Helen of Antwerp, who far surpasses Helen of Troy".

Paintings

Helena Fourment

Portraits

Helena Fourment in wedding dress, Munich, Alte Pinakothek, 1630-1631; a studio copy of this work is in the collection of the Rijksmuseum
Pörtrait of Helena Fourment with a glove", Munich, Alte Pinakothek (same as above?)Helena Fourment with her eldest son, Frans, 1635, Munich, Alte PinakothekRubens and Helena Fourment walking in their garden, MunichHelena Fourment with her children Clara, Johanna, and Frans, 1636-1637, LouvreHelena Fourment and Frans Rubens, LouvreRubens, his wife Helena Fourment, and their son Peter Paul, c. 1639, Metropolitan Museum of ArtPortrait of Helena Fourment(?) a studio work in the collection of the Royal Museum of Fine Arts in BrusselsPortrait of Helena Fourment(?) a 17th-century work from Antwerp, now in the Rubenshuis

ModelJudgment of Paris, Museo del Prado (the Venus-figure is modelled on Helena Fourment)The Garden of Love, Prado, 1630–1633Het Pelsken, 1638, Kunsthistorisches Museum, ViennaThe Origin of the Milky Way, 

Siblings: Clara van Hecke née Fourment, and Susanna Lunden née Fourment

Notes

Further reading

 (see index, v.1; Lunden, Susanna (née Fourment)'' for information about her daughter)

External links

1614 births
1673 deaths
Models from Antwerp
Family of Peter Paul Rubens
Brouchoven family
Belgian artists' models
People of the Spanish Netherlands